Yaariyan may refer to:

 Yaariyan (2008 film), an Indian Punjabi-language film
 Yaariyan (2014 film), an Indian Hindi-language film
 Yaariyan (TV series), a 2019 Pakistani drama series

See also
 Yaari (disambiguation)
 Yariyan, a 2010 Pakistani TV series